The Fiat Abarth 1000 TC is a special high-performance racing-oriented version of the Fiat 600, designed and developed by Italian manufacturer Abarth, and built to Group 2 (and later Group 5) touring car specifications, in 1964.

References

Abarth vehicles
Fiat vehicles
Cars introduced in 1964
Sports cars
Cars of Italy